Všechlapy is name of several locations in the Czech Republic:
Všechlapy (Benešov District)
Všechlapy (Nymburk District)